Positive is a 2008 Indian Malayalam-language suspense thriller film directed by V. K. Prakash starring Jayasurya, Skanda Ashok, Vani Kishore, Saikumar and Ananya. The film was a hit and was dubbed into Telugu as Suspense in 2016.

Plot 
Raju, Vini, Udayan and Jerry who are close friends form a music troupe. In the meantime, Raju starts an affair with a young girl named Jyothi. But one day Jyothi left the hostel without telling anything to Raju.

Jyothi was forced by her brother Mahesh and his wife to marry Das. Jyothi and Das got married and were shifted to a flat where she got nearby friend Vini. Vini's parents try to get her married off to a Police officer named Aniyan. Even though this marriage doesn't take place, something drastic happens. After three months of marriage, Das was found dead. They now have to face ACP Aniyan, who confronts them as a police officer. Aniyan questions Jyothi in her flat, while he noticed hair strand on a towel and he takes that with him and send it for a forensic test and later learns that the hair thread was that of Rose, servant of Das and also a relative of Joseph, the security of the building.

Later by questioning Rose, she cooks up another story where Das was attempting to rape her. Later by questioning her the truth comes out that Das had kept a box full of counterfeit money in his flat which was found by her and she called Joseph also and they both decided to take that money with them (without knowing that it was fake). Meanwhile, Das came to the flat and found that Rose was sweating and he asked the reason where she told nothing and later he found his money was lost and asked her about the same and by that time Joseph kills Das by hitting on his head and they both together hanged him on the fan. They both were sent to jail.

Cast 

 Jayasurya as Aniyan IPS , Assistant Commissioner of Police
 Skanda Ashok as Raju
 Vani Kishore as Vini
 Manikuttan as Udayan
 Ramesh Pisharody as Jerry
 Shari as Sujatha
 Saikumar as City Police Commissioner 
 Jagathy Sreekumar as Uthaman
 Ananya as Jyothi
 T. G. Ravi as Constable Ravi
 Augustine as Joseph
 Vimal Raj as Pappan
 Bindu Panicker as Usha
 Sudheer Sukumaran as Das
 Boban Alummoodan as Mahesh
 Maya Viswanath
 Bindu Ramakrishnan
 Deepika Mohan
 Ambika Mohan

Soundtrack 
The film's soundtrack contains 4 songs, all composed by Alex Paul and Lyrics by Sarath Vayalar.

References

2008 films
2000s Malayalam-language films
Films scored by Alex Paul
Films directed by V. K. Prakash